Cory Morgan is a Canadian blogger, Alberta independence activist and columnist for the Western Standard.  He was one of the founders of the Alberta Independence Party in 2000. In 2001, he ran as an independent candidate in the riding of Banff-Cochrane.  Following the dissolution of the AIP at the end of 2000, Morgan joined the Separation Party of Alberta. He was the SPA's candidate in Highwood in the provincial election of 2004.

He later joined the Alberta Alliance in 2006.  He was a candidate for the Wildrose Alliance Party of Alberta, in the constituency of Calgary Mountain View in the Alberta general election of 2008, finishing in third-place with 887 votes.

On November 6, 2011, Morgan drove his pickup truck into the Occupy Calgary camp at Olympic Plaza park. Morgan refused to leave his truck until police removed him, was fined $200 and towed.  His purpose was part of a counter-protest against Occupy Calgary and a bid to highlight what he felt was unequal enforcement of city bylaws with respect to the Occupy camp and the public at large.

Morgan ran in the 2015 Canadian federal election as a Libertarian in Foothills, finishing in fifth-place with 424 votes.

Following the 2019 Canadian federal election Morgan returned to his Western separatist roots, calling on his supporters to join him.

Electoral history

References

External links 
 Blog – Cory Morgan ranting and raving: Political and Personal

Living people
Separation Party of Alberta candidates in Alberta provincial elections
Wildrose Party candidates in Alberta provincial elections
People from Red Deer, Alberta
Libertarian Party of Canada politicians
Libertarian Party of Canada candidates for the Canadian House of Commons
Canadian libertarians
Western Canadian separatists
Year of birth missing (living people)